Karl Fergus Connor Miller FRSL (2 August 1931 – 24 September 2014) was a Scottish literary editor, critic and writer.

Miller was born in the village of Loanhead, Midlothian, and was educated at the Royal High School of Edinburgh and Downing College, Cambridge, where he studied English; he was a Cambridge Apostle. He became literary editor of The Spectator and the New Statesman. Miller resigned from the latter over a disagreement with the magazine's editor Paul Johnson, over the extent to which the literary pages treated difficult subjects and also Johnson's disapproval of The Beatles and their fans.

He was then editor of The Listener (1967–73) and subsequently of the London Review of Books, which he founded, from 1979 to 1992. He was also Lord Northcliffe Professor of Modern English Literature and head of the English Department at University College London from 1974 to 1992.

Miller died on 24 September 2014, at the age of 83.

Works 
 Poetry from Cambridge 1952–4. Oxford, 1955 (editor)
 Writing in England Today: the last fifteen years. London: Penguin, 1968 (editor)
 Memoirs of a Modern Scotland. London: Faber, 1970 (editor)
 Cockburn's Millennium. London: Duckworth, 1975 (a biography of Henry Cockburn, which won Miller the James Tait Black Memorial Prize)
 Doubles: Studies in Literary History. Oxford: Oxford University Press, 1985 (criticism)
 Authors. Oxford: Clarendon, 1989
 Rebecca's Vest: a memoir. London: Hamish Hamilton, 1993
 Boswell and Hyde. London: Syrens, 1995
 Dark Horses: an experience of literary journalism. London: Picador, 1998 (memoir)
 Seamus Heaney in conversation with Karl Miller. London: BTL, 2000
 Electric Shepherd: a likeness of James Hogg. London: Faber, 2003 (biography)
 Tretower to Clyro: essays. London: Quercus, 2011

References

External links 

 Stuart A. Rose Manuscript, Archives, and Rare Book Library, Emory University: Karl Miller papers, 1949–2007

1931 births
2014 deaths
Academics of University College London
Alumni of Downing College, Cambridge
People from Midlothian
Scottish biographers
British biographers
British male journalists
British magazine editors
People educated at the Royal High School, Edinburgh
Scottish essayists
Fellows of the Royal Society of Literature
British literary editors
James Tait Black Memorial Prize recipients
British male essayists
New Statesman people
Male biographers